This is a list of the busiest airports in Bulgaria by number of passengers begins 2013.

In graph

Passenger statistics

References

 
Bulgaria
Bulgaria, busy
Airports, busiest
Airports, busiest